Kevin Michael (born Kevin Michael Seward, October 22, 1985, in Chester, Pennsylvania) is an American pop artist that was signed to Downtown Records in 2007, the same year he released his self-titled debut album.

Early life
Born in Chester, Pennsylvania, Michael grew up in a mixed-race family.  His father is African-American and his mother is biracial.  This had quite an effect on him as a child growing up and would serve as one of his main messages in later musical work.  He is a self-taught vocalist with a five octave range. Kevin cites artists like Prince, Michael Jackson and Stevie Wonder as some of his biggest musical influences.  At the age of 16 he wrote his first song, and has continued writing his own material throughout the years.  Kevin says he loves writing music just as much as singing it.

2006–2009
Michael received attention from Virgin Records and Columbia Records while still a teenager, but ultimately signed with Atlantic Records and their Downtown Records imprint.

His first EP Ya Dig? was featured only on iTunes and the buzz single "We All Want The Same Thing" was highlighted on iTunes Store as the Single of the Week for May 8, 2007. "We All Want The Same Thing" featured rapper Lupe Fiasco and was featured in a Verizon Wireless V CAST Song ID commercial.

Kevin Michael's first official single from his full-length LP was "It Don't Make Any Difference", both produced by and featuring Wyclef Jean.  In the song Kevin talks about interracial relationships and the product of being a bi-racial adult himself.  A video for the song was shot in Brooklyn, NY in May 2007 directed by video collective Syndrome (James Larese).  The video and song was received well by both MTV and VH1 Soul.

Michael's performance was favorably reviewed on day two of the August 2007 Lollapalooza concert in Chicago, describing Kevin as a "young singer with the towering afro and a voice that mixes the soulful side of Michael Jackson with a hip-hop edge." He has also performed at MTV's 2007 Video Music Awards at The Palms Casino Pool in Las Vegas.

The debut album Kevin Michael was released on October 2, 2007.  He was on separate tours with Lily Allen, and then Maroon 5 in 2007. In 2008, he toured with John Legend on the Pepsi Smash Tour.

He appeared in the 2009 romantic-comedy (500) Days of Summer as the wedding singer.  His cover of Etta James' "At Last" was included on the movie's soundtrack.

2010 to present
On June 10, 2010, Michael resurfaced under the alias KofTHEY (K being the initial for his name, and THEY being a group acronym standing for THE Youth) and released THEY's first single, "Areola" on their YouTube channel, KofTHEY.

On March 14, 2011, Michael opened Twitter and Facebook accounts as KofTHEY.

On March 16, 2011, he released the follow-up album International for a limited release in Japan.

On April 5, 2011, he launched the TeamTHEY website and released two new songs under KofTHEY.

On July 1, 2011, Michael released Covers For You, a nine-song cover album.  The album also includes one track from his International album.

In 2019, he published a new single "Sidenixxa".

In popular culture

Discography

Studio albums

EPs

Singles

Soundtrack appearances

References

External links
 Official website
 Official Myspace page

1985 births
African-American  male songwriters
American people of Italian descent
Atlantic Records artists
Living people
Musicians from Philadelphia
American neo soul singers
People from Chester, Pennsylvania
People from Delaware County, Pennsylvania
Songwriters from Pennsylvania
Singers from Pennsylvania
21st-century African-American male singers